An enterocutaneous fistula (ECF) is an abnormal communication between the small or large bowel and the skin that allows the contents of the stomach or intestines to leak through an opening in the skin.

Causes
The mnemonic HIS FRIENDS can be used to memorize characteristics which impede the closure of  ECF.

H: high output
I: IBD
S:short tract
 F Foreign body
 R Radiation
 I Infection or Inflammatory bowel disease
 E Epithelialization
 N Neoplasm
 D Distal obstruction
 S Short tract (<2 cm)

Diagnosis

Classification
Congenital types: tracheoesophageal, vitellointestinal duct, patent urachus, rectovaginal

Acquired: trauma (postoperative), radiation, malignancy, infection

Two categories
Low-output fistula: < 500 mL/day

High-output fistula: > 500 mL/day

Three categories
Low-output fistula: < 200 mL/day

Moderate-output fistula: 200–500 mL/day

High-output fistula: > 500 mL/day

Treatment
The majority will close spontaneously within approximately 6 weeks. If it has not closed by 12 weeks, it is unlikely to do so and definitive surgery should be planned. The median time to definitive repair from fistula onset was 6 months (range 1 day to 28 months). The 6-month time course is commonly utilized by groups with significant experience treating fistulas, owing to the trend in encountering a less hostile abdomen than in the early phases. Some evidence also suggests that somatostatin can be an effective treatment with respect to reducing closure time and improving the spontaneous closure rate of enterocutaneous fistulas.

References

 

Digestive diseases
Fistulas
Medical mnemonics